An animal nutritionist is a person who specializes in animal nutrition, which is especially concerned with the dietary needs of animals in captivity: livestock, pets, and animals in wildlife rehabilitation facilities.

The science of animal nutrition encompasses principles of chemistry (especially biochemistry), physics, mathematics, ethology (animal behavior). An animal nutrition in the food industry may also be concerned with economics and food processing.

Education
A Bachelor of Science in agricultural, biological or related life sciences is usually required. A typical course would study metabolism of proteins, carbohydrates, lipids, minerals, vitamins and water, and the relationship of these nutrients and animal production. A Master’s degree in nutrition is often seen in animal nutrition and the field  often requires a Ph.D. in the science of nutrition.

Career activities 
Those with an educational background can expect to be employed in the following areas:
Evaluating the chemical and nutritional value of various animal feeds, feed supplements, grass and forage for livestock, recreational animals such as horses and ponies, pet foods for companion animals, fish, and birds
Nutritional disorders and the preservation of feeds
Diet formulation and ration size
Diets for performance and health
Diets for reproduction of animals
Economics of feeding systems
Dietary regimens
Animal studies and laboratory trials
Marketing strategies for new food formulas
Quality control and performance of feeds
Investigating nutritional disorders and diet related diseases

Notable animal nutritionists
Martin R. Dinnes, Ph.D.
Chantal Kaboré-Zoungrana Ph.D (former head of the national Burkina Faso National Biosafety Agency).

External links 
Auburn University Department of Animal Nutrition
Iowa State University Department of Animal Nutrition  
Cal Poly Animal Sciences

References

Veterinary professions
Dog-related professions and professionals
Animal care occupations